Israil Asludievich Kasumov (born 2 June 1990 in Serzhen-Yurt.) is a Russian freestyle wrestler of Chechen ethnicity.  Kasumov is a four-time Ivan Yarygin Golden Grand Prix gold-medallist, from 2014, 2016, 2017 and 2020) and the 2021 European Champion, which took place in Warsaw, Poland

References

External links
 

Russian male sport wrestlers
European Wrestling Championships medalists
People from Shalinsky District, Chechen Republic
1990 births
Living people
European Wrestling Champions
Sportspeople from Chechnya